Organoneptunium chemistry is the chemical science exploring the properties, structure and reactivity of organoneptunium compounds, which are organometallic compounds containing a carbon to neptunium chemical bond. Several such compounds exist even though the element itself, neptunium, is man-made and highly radioactive: tricyclopentadienylneptunium-chloride,  tetrakis(cyclopentadienyl)neptunium(IV) and neptunocene Np(C8H8)2.

References

Neptunium